David W. Thomas House is a historic home located near Odessa, New Castle County, Delaware.  It was built about 1820 and is a two-story, three-bay brick dwelling with interior brick chimneys at both gable ends. It has a gable roof with dormers. There is a contemporary kitchen wing with a laundry room addition. The house measures approximately 32 feet by 19 feet and has a hall and parlor plan. It is in the Federal style.  Also on the property is a contributing 19th century ice house.

It was listed on the National Register of Historic Places in 1992.

References

Houses on the National Register of Historic Places in Delaware
Federal architecture in Delaware
Houses completed in 1820
Houses in New Castle County, Delaware
National Register of Historic Places in New Castle County, Delaware